Austin Noonan (16 July 1933 – 7 November 2022) was an Irish football player and manager who played for Cork Celtic and Cork Hibernians in the League of Ireland. He also served as manager of Cork Hibernians.

Career
Noonan first played football as a schoolboy with Maymount. Considered too small and light as a youth player, he later played with Colmcille's and Ballinlough before being selected on the Cork AUL. 

Noonan signed for Evergreen United (later Cork Celtic) for the 1953–54 season. He formed a close goal-scoring partnership with Donie Leahy and, after spending much of the 1958-59 season on the sideline with a troublesome right ankle injury, was the league's overall top scorer with 27 goals the following season. Noonan was honoured by the League of Ireland XI selectors on a couple of occasions, while his other honours include Top Four Cup, Shield, Dublin City Cup and Munster Senior Cup winners' medals.

Noonan transferred to local rivals Cork Hibernians in 1966 before taking over as manager. He has the distinction of being the club's manager in 1970 when their Shield victory qualified them to play in a European competition for the first time.

Death
Noonan died on 7 November 2022, at the age of 89.

Honours
Cork Celtic
League of Ireland Shield: 1960–61
Dublin City Cup: 1961–62
Top Four Cup: 1956–57, 1958–59, 1959–60
Munster Senior League: 1955–56
Munster Senior Cup: 1959–60, 1961–62, 1963–64

References

1933 births
2022 deaths
Republic of Ireland association footballers
Association footballers from Cork (city)
Association football midfielders
League of Ireland players
Cork Celtic F.C. players
Cork Hibernians F.C. players
League of Ireland XI players
League of Ireland managers